Muhammad Shah III Lashkari or Shamsuddin Muhammad Shah III was the sultan of the Bahmani Sultanate from 1463 to 1482.

Ascension
Muhammad Shah III was 8 or 9 years old when he ascended the throne on 30 July 1463 on the death of his brother, Nizam-Ud-Din Ahmad III.

Reign
Mahmud Gawan was appointed vizier and served as one of the regents under Makhduma-e-Jahan Nargis Begum. With Gawan, Muhammad Shah subjected most of the Konkan and defeated the Gajapati Kingdom in 1470, thus securing the west coast trade until the arrival of the Portuguese. At the same time, standard measurements and valuations of agricultural land were introduced, along with other policies to unify the sultanate. Unfortunately, these actions upset many powerful people who convinced Muhammad Shah III to execute Mahmud Gawan in 1481.

Succession
Soon after the death of Gawan, the sultan himself died of remorse on 26 March 1482. He was succeeded by his son, Mahmood Shah Bahmani II.

References

Sultans
15th-century births
1482 deaths
15th-century Indian Muslims
Bahmani Sultans